The , also known as Shōnai Park, are located in Nishi-ku, Nagoya in central Japan. The Shōnai River passes by south of the park.

Access by public transport is by Shōnai Ryokuchi Kōen Station on the Tsurumai Line.

Parks and gardens in Nagoya